Diana Elizabeth Pesántez Salto is an Ecuadorian politician who took up her position at the National Assembly three days after the 2021 election. She is a member of the BAN party and she represents Azuay Province.

Life
She comes from Cuenca.

In 2017 to 2021 she was the alternate for Wilma Andrade where she was an active legislator. In the 2021 election she was the alternate for Marcelo Cabrera. On election Cabrera became the Minister of Transport and Pesántez took up her role representing Azuay at Ecuador's 4th National Assembly on the 24th May.

She became a permanent Member of the Permanent Commission for Economic, Productive Development and Microenterprise.

References

Living people
Members of the National Assembly (Ecuador)
Women members of the National Assembly (Ecuador)
Year of birth missing (living people)